Crossostomus is a genus of marine ray-finned fishes belonging to the family Zoarcidae, the eelpouts. They are found in the southeastern Pacific Ocean and the southwestern Atlantic Ocean.

Species
Crossostomus has two valid species within it:

References

Lycodinae